Frank Schütze (born 2 July 1956) is a German rower. He competed in the men's eight event at the 1976 Summer Olympics.

References

External links
 

1956 births
Living people
German male rowers
Olympic rowers of West Germany
Rowers at the 1976 Summer Olympics
People from Uelzen
Sportspeople from Lower Saxony